The Douglas Lake Member is a geologic unit of member rank of the  Lenoir Limestone that overlies the Mascot Dolomite and underlies typical nodular member of the Lenoir Limestone in Douglas Lake, Tennessee, region. It fills depressions that are part of a regional unconformity at the base of Middle Ordovician strata, locally the Lenoir Limestone, that separates them from the underlying Lower Ordovician strata, locally the Knox Group.

Nomenclature
It was named by Josiah Bridge for Douglas Lake, Tennessee.

Lithology
The Douglas Lake Member is composed of a diverse set of sedimentary rocks, including rubble conglomerate, chert conglomerate, and black dolomite. In outcrops along the north shore of Lake Douglas, the chert conglomerate overlies the rubble conglomerate and both of which fill prehistoric sinkholes, called paleokarst, developed in upper surface of the Mascot Dolomite. Such paleokarst depression fills, which are part of a regional uncomformity, are common throughout this region. They are generally included in the Lenoir Limestone as the Douglas Lake Member.

At Douglas Dam, the Douglas Lake Member consists of three-part sequence of volcanic ash, conglomerate and shale and / or shaly dolomite that fill one of these ancient sinkholes developed in the Mascot Dolomite of the Knox Group. The upper unit overlied a middle unit, which consisted of varve-like graded beds with concentrations of organic matter at their top and interlayered with recurrent layers and lenses of conglomerate and breccia. It is this unit from which all of the fossils were recovered. This exposure of the Douglas Lake Member was named the 33 beds in 1944. In 1955, the 33 beds were assigned to the Douglas Lake Member of the Lenoir Limestone. The 33 beds were completely excavated for construction of Douglas Dam by the Tennessee Valley Authority in 1942, but yielded articulated arthropod fossils including Chasmataspis and Douglasocaris. Fossil plant compressions from this unit reveal the variety of non-vascular plants which lived on land before Silurian evolution of vascular land plants.

Fossils
At Douglas Dam, the Douglas Lake Member has long been known for its articulated Chasmataspidid Chasmataspsis laurenci and phyllocarid Douglasiocaris collinsi. As the Douglas Dam Lagerstatte, these fossils are associated with compression fossils of a variety of non-vascular land plants,  including hornwort Casterlorum crispum, liverwort Cestites mirabilis, balloonwort Janegraya sibylla, peat moss Dollyphyton boucotii. and harsh moss Edwardsiphyton ovatum. Also found were remains of the mycorrhizal fungus Palaeoglomus strotheri and the likely lichen Prototaxites honeggeri. The fossils are compressions of original carapaces of the arthropods and the organic carbon of the plant fossils. In 2022 however, researchers such as paleobotanist Dianne Edwards referred study of plant fossils and commented "When diagnostic features are absent, such fragmentary organic materials can be misinterpreted, leading to implausible attributions". Aside from that, biologist Egbert Leigh supported fossil affinity as plants.

Age 
The paleokarst depressions occupied by the Douglas Lake Member are part of the Knox Unconformity that separates the Lower Ordovician Knox Group from the Middle Ordovician Chickamauga Group. The Lenoir Limestone is the basal unit of the Chickamauga Group in the Douglas Lake region. In this region, the Knox Unconformity is a highly irregular surface, which appears to represent karst terrain that formed during a 12- to 13-million-year-long period of subaerial exposure that forms a hiatus in sedimentary record between the Sauk and Tippecanoe sequences. This unconformity represents periods of falling relative sea level starting in latter part of the Floian Stage, which halted the accumulation marine sediments of the Knox Group and exposed the region to terrestrial erosion and karstification. It is not until late in the  Darriwilian Stage that rises in relative sea level drowned the Douglas Lake region and initiated the accumulation of the marine sediments that now comprise the Lenoir Limestone. Therefore, the Douglas Lake Member and the fossils it contains are younger than the underlying Floian strata and older than the late Darriwilian limestones of the Lenoir Limestone.

Depositional Environment
At Douglas Dam, the Douglas Lake Member is argued to have accumulated within a within a cenote at a time of lowered sealevel and, based on paleogeographic reconstructions, to have been many kilometers from the sea. Although the biota is strikingly terrestrial, Caster and Brooks differently interprets the environment of deposition at Douglas Dam as being a marine submarine spring fed by an underground channel or system of underground channels from the nearby land.

See also
 List of fossiliferous stratigraphic units in Tennessee

References

External links
 Stamm, N., 2020. USGS Geologic Names Committee Archives (maintained ca. 1900-1990), National Geologic Map Database.

Ordovician geology of Tennessee
Ordovician System of North America
Paleozoic southern paleotemperate deposits
Darriwilian
Shale formations
Lagerstätten